Keith Ross Cory (born February 4, 1957) is a Canadian former professional ice hockey defenceman. He played 51 games in the National Hockey League with the Winnipeg Jets during the 1979–80 and 1980–81 seasons, scoring two goals and ten assists.

Career statistics

Regular season and playoffs

External links
 

1957 births
Living people
Canadian expatriate ice hockey players in the United States
Canadian ice hockey defencemen
ECD Iserlohn players
Ice hockey people from Calgary
Tulsa Oilers (1964–1984) players
UBC Thunderbirds ice hockey players
Undrafted National Hockey League players
Winnipeg Jets (1979–1996) players